Abbott and Costello in Hollywood is a 1945 American black-and-white comedy film directed by S. Sylvan Simon and starring the comedy team of Abbott and Costello alongside Frances Rafferty. Made by Metro-Goldwyn-Mayer, it was produced by Martin A. Gosch.

Plot
A barber, Buzz Curtis, and a porter, Abercrombie, work for a Hollywood salon. They are sent to the office of agent Norman Royce to give him a haircut and a shoeshine. On the way there they run into former co-worker Claire Warren, who is about to star as the lead in a new musical. At the same time her co-star Gregory LeMaise, whose fame is dwindling, arrives and invites her to join him at lunch. She declines, which angers him.

While at the agent's office Buzz and Abercrombie witness LeMaise enter and declare to Royce that he cannot work with Claire. Royce, who has just seen a young singer, Jeff Parker audition, fires LeMaise and offers the job to Parker. This causes LeMaise to change his mind, and Royce does as well, giving LeMaise his job back. Buzz and Abercrombie quickly switch careers and become Parker's agents, and head to the studio's chief, Mr. Kavanaugh, to find a role for Parker.

Unfortunately, when they meet up with Kavanaugh it's because they just crashed their car into his at the studio gate. Kavanaugh bans them from the lot, but they manage to sneak back in with a group of extras. Once inside they find themselves at the wardrobe department and Buzz gets dressed as a cop and Abercrombie as a tramp. They use their newfound disguises to roam the lot.

Later, Buzz and Abercrombie try to help Parker get the role by getting LeMaise out of the picture by trying to start a fight with him. Their plan is to photograph him hitting Abercrombie and then having him arrested. The plan goes off without a hitch until Abercombie falls overboard after being hit and is feared drowned. LeMaise decides to hide, and Parker is given the role in his place. LeMaise eventually discovers that Abercrombie is still alive and chases him around the backlot. LeMaise eventually is caught, and Claire and Parker become famous when the film is successful.  Subsequently, Buzz and Abercrombie become big-time agents in Hollywood.

Cast
 
 Bud Abbott as Buzz Kurtis  
 Lou Costello as Abercrombie  
 Frances Rafferty as Claire Warren  
 Bob Haymes as Jeff Parker (as Robert Stanton)  
 Jean Porter as Ruthie  
 Warner Anderson as Norman Royce  
 Rags Ragland as himself (as 'Rags' Ragland)  
 Mike Mazurki as Klondike Pete  
 Carleton G. Young as Gregory LeMaise  
 Donald MacBride as Dennis Kavanaugh  
 Edgar Dearing as First Studio Cop  
 Marion Martin as Miss Milbane  
 Arthur Space as Director  
 William Phillips as Kavanaugh's Assistant, (as Wm. 'Bill' Phillips)

Production
Filming took place from April 10 through June 1, 1945, with some retakes filmed in July.

During production, Abbott and Costello returned to Universal Studios on May 13 for retakes on The Naughty Nineties (1945).

This is the last of three feature films that Abbott and Costello made on loan to Metro-Goldwyn-Mayer while under contract to Universal; the other two features were Rio Rita (1942) and Lost in a Harem (1944).

Many stars appear in the film as themselves, such as Lucille Ball, Rags Ragland, Preston Foster, and Dean Stockwell.

Routines performed
Insomnia is one of the routines that Abbott and Costello perform. Costello is unable to fall asleep, so Abbott gives him a record that is guaranteed to put anyone to sleep. However, no one is around to turn it off, and when the needle reaches the end, it starts skipping, which wakes him. Abbott agrees to stay awake to turn it off when it is over, but falls under the spell of the record and goes to sleep himself. They try again, this time with cotton in Abbott's ears (a sequence that was used in the MGM compilation film, (That's Entertainment, Part II). When this also fails, Costello ties a string from his foot to the record player. The thought is when he falls asleep, his foot will drop shutting off the machine, but instead it turns on the radio, which blasts a loud march!

Reception
Bosley Crowther of The New York Times wrote: "Among the real rib-tickling sketches in this film the two high spots are Costello's schooling in the tonsorial art and his desperate battle to overcome insomnia. During these interludes his brilliant pantomimic talents are brought into full play. As for the rest, well, even half a laugh is better than none." Variety wrote: "An Abbott and Costello picture may not be an artistic triumph, but the duo certainly try hard enough to make audiences laugh. Their latest, 'Abbott and Costello in Hollywood,' is no exception; it should do fairly good business." Harrison's Reports wrote that the film "should more than satisfy those who respond easily to [Abbott & Costello's] particular brand of slapstick humor."

Home media
Warner Home Video released the film on DVD November 21, 2006 with Lost in a Harem (1944).

Notes

References

External links

 
 
 
 

1945 films
Abbott and Costello films
1940s English-language films
Films directed by S. Sylvan Simon
Metro-Goldwyn-Mayer films
American comedy films
1945 comedy films
American black-and-white films
1940s American films